Radial collateral ligament can refer to:
 Radial collateral ligament of elbow joint
 Radial collateral ligament of wrist joint
 Radial collateral ligament of thumb